SN1 may refer to:
 SN1 reaction, a type of organic chemical reaction
 (7990) 1981 SN1, a Main Belt minor planet
 (7058) 1990 SN1, a main-belt minor planet
 a SN postcode for Swindon, England
 Sportsnet One, a Canadian sports channel